Garajonay Express was a ferry company in the Canary Islands which ceased operating in November 2008.
The firm was named after the National park Garajonay on the island of La Gomera. See article: Garajonay National Park.

Routes
The ferry firm previously connected Los Cristianos in Tenerife with San Sebastian, Playa Santiago, and Valle Gran Rey in La Gomera. Garajonay Express operated the two High-speed crafts Garajonay and Orone. These were second-hand ferries sold on from Italian ferry operator SNAV.
The ship's route 'The Gomera Inline Route' was awarded to fellow ferry firm Fred. Olsen Express, who used a similar ferry called Benchi Express (IMO 9059171) to operate this route until 2012.

Collapse of The Company
Since its collapse, its two rivals, Fred Olsen Express and a conventional ship operator Naviera Armas have considerably upped their fares on the La Gomera-Los Cristianos services.

Photo gallery

External links

 

Ferry companies of Spain
La Gomera
Transport in the Canary Islands